This List of American films of 1935 indexes American feature-length motion pictures that were released in 1935.

Mutiny on the Bounty won the Academy Award for Outstanding Picture at the 8th Academy Awards, presented on March 5, 1936.

A–B

C–D

E–F

G–H

I–J

K–L

M–N

O–Q

R–S

T–U

V–Z

See also
 1935 in the United States

References

External links

1935 films at the Internet Movie Database

1935
Films
Lists of 1935 films by country or language